Peter Linebaugh is an American Marxist historian who specializes in British history, Irish history, labor history, and the history of the colonial Atlantic. He is a member of the Midnight Notes Collective.

Early life
Peter Linebaugh was born in 1942 He was a student of British labor historian E. P. Thompson, and received his Ph.D. in British history from the University of Warwick in 1975. He has taught at University of Rochester, New York University, University of Massachusetts–Boston, Franconia College, Harvard University, and Tufts University.  Linebaugh retired from the University of Toledo in 2014.

Career
Linebaugh's books have been generally well received within the discipline of history, and several of his books have demonstrated popularity among general readers.  Historian Robin Kelley praised Linebaugh's most recent book, arguing in a review of The Magna Carta Manifesto (2008) that there is "not a more important historian living today. Period."

In late April 2012, Occupy Ypsilanti published and began to distribute throughout Ypsilanti, Michigan, free of charge, Linebaugh's Ypsilanti Vampire May Day. His writing also appears in New Left Review, the New York University Law Review, Radical History Review, and Social History.

Personal life
Linebaugh is married to Michaela Brennan. He has two daughters, Kate and Riley Linebaugh.

References

Bibliography
Linebaugh, Peter, Hay, Doug, and Thompson, E.P. (eds.). Albion's Fatal Tree: Crime and Society in Eighteenth-Century England. Pantheon Press, 1975.
The London Hanged: Crime and Civil Society in the Eighteenth Century. London: Allen Lane, 1991.
Linebaugh, Peter and Rediker, Marcus. The Many-Headed Hydra: Sailors, Slaves, Commoners and the Hidden History of the Revolutionary Atlantic. Boston: Beacon Press, 2001.
The Magna Carta Manifesto: Liberties and Commons for All. Berkeley: University of California Press, 2008.
Ned Ludd & Queen Mab: Machine-Breaking, Romanticism, and the Several Commons of 1811–12'. PM press, 2012.
 
 The Incomplete, True, Authentic, and Wonderful History of May Day, PM Press 2016 SKU: 9781629631073.
 Red Hot Globe Round Burning: A Tale at the Crossroads of Commons and Closure, of Love and Terror, of Race and Class, and of Kate and Ned Despard. Berkeley: University of California Press, 2019.

Books
The London Hanged: crime and civil society in the eighteenth century. Cambridge: Cambridge University Press, 1992.
The Many-Headed Hydra: Sailors, Slaves, Commoners and the Hidden History of the Revolutionary Atlantic. (with Marcus Rediker), Boston: Beacon Press, 2001
The Magna Carta Manifesto: Liberties and Commons for All, 2009

21st-century American historians
21st-century American male writers
Labor historians
American Marxist historians
American male non-fiction writers
Marxist humanists
Alumni of the University of Warwick
University of Toledo faculty
Year of birth missing (living people)
Living people
University of Rochester faculty
Tufts University faculty
Harvard University faculty
New York University faculty
University of Massachusetts Boston faculty